In enzymology, a flavanone 7-O-glucoside 2"-O-beta-L-rhamnosyltransferase is an enzyme that catalyzes the chemical reaction

UDP-L-rhamnose + a flavanone 7-O-glucoside  UDP + a flavanone 7-O-[beta-L-rhamnosyl-(1->2)-beta-D-glucoside]

Thus, the two substrates of this enzyme are UDP-L-rhamnose and flavanone 7-O-glucoside, whereas its two products are UDP and [[flavanone 7-O-[beta-L-rhamnosyl-(1->2)-beta-D-glucoside]]].

This enzyme belongs to the family of glycosyltransferases, specifically the hexosyltransferases.  The systematic name of this enzyme class is UDP-L-rhamnose:flavanone-7-O-glucoside 2''-O-beta-L-rhamnosyltransferase. Other names in common use include UDP-rhamnose:flavanone-7-O-glucoside-2"-O-rhamnosyltransferase, and 1->2 UDP-rhamnosyltransferase.

References

 

EC 2.4.1
Enzymes of unknown structure